The 2019 World Team Ninepin Bowling Classic Championships was the eighth edition of the team championships and held in Rokycany, Czech Republic, from 16 May to 26 May 2019.

In men's tournament Serbia has secured gold medal, while in women's tournament world champion title was captured by Croatia.

Schedule

Two competitions will be held.

All time are local (UTC+2).

Participating teams

Men

Women

Medal summary

Medal table

References 

 
World Team Ninepin Bowling Classic Championships
2019 in bowling
2019 in Czech sport
International sports competitions hosted by the Czech Republic
ninepin bowling classic